Kettins is a village in Perth and Kinross, Scotland about  northeast of Perth and  northwest of Dundee.

Notable people

Robert Trail minister of the parish 1746 to 1753
John Ker minister 1744/45

See also
Coupar Angus

References 

Villages in Perth and Kinross